Stenalia pectoralis is a beetle in the genus Stenalia of the family Mordellidae. It was described in 1929 by Píc.

References

pectoralis
Beetles described in 1929